Stafilovo is a rural locality (a village) in Zadneselskoye Rural Settlement, Ust-Kubinsky  District, Vologda Oblast, Russia. The population was 51 as of 2002. There are 2 streets.

Geography 
Stafilovo is located 21 km north of Ustye (the district's administrative centre) by road. Shikhovo is the nearest rural locality.

References 

Rural localities in Tarnogsky District